The Ruf SCR is a sports car manufactured by German automobile manufacturer Ruf Automobile. The SCR (sometimes written "SC/R") was based on the Porsche 911 SC and the changes made to its engine enabled it to have similar performance to the 930 Turbo, despite having a naturally aspirated engine.

History 
Due to the Gulf Oil Crisis of the 1970s and more strict emission laws, Porsche like many other car manufacturers at that time, reduced the power output of its naturally aspirated flat-six engine to  thus creating a huge power and performance gap in its naturally aspirated 911 lineage and the Turbo. Those wanting a model lying in-between that gap had to opt for the expensive and luxurious 928 grand tourer.

Seeing the potential of the naturally aspirated engine to generate a higher power output while maintaining fuel economy, Ruf introduced the SCR in 1978 based on the 911 SC. This marked the first Ruf modification done to a Porsche 911. This was combined with a special Ruf-built gearbox with a longer fifth gear, along with a Bosch K-Jetronic fuel injection system and front mounted oil coolers, thus achieving the desired fuel efficiency whilst maintaining a higher power output than the donor car (17.3L/100km). The SCR did require high octane ("Super") petrol rather than the regular octane fuel used by Porsche's own 911 SC, however.

Other aesthetic changes included the "whale tail" spoiler found on the 930 Turbo, a deep chin spoiler at the front, a new front bumper with integrated round brake cooling ducts, optional wide wheel arches as found on the 930 Turbo and special Ruf 5-spoke alloy wheels. The car had a Spartan driver-focused interior with racing bucket seats and six-point racing harness. All of these changes enabled the SCR to achieve performance levels closely approximating those of the Turbo.

The SCR, with its performance filled the void left between the naturally aspirated 911 models and the Turbo while still costing less than the latter at 65,000 DM (the 930 Turbo had a price tag of 79,000 DM while the 911 SC and the 928 had price tags of 41,860 and 60,707 DM respectively). Its publicity in German automobile magazines at the time of its introduction made it a commercial success.

Performance 

Specifications 
Engine:
 Longitudinally mounted air-cooled flat-6 engine
  of displacement
 Bore x stroke of 98.0 mm x 70.4 mm
 Bosch K-Jetronic mechanical fuel injection
 Chain driven Overhead Camshaft per cylinder bank
 Eight main bearing crankshaft
 Electronic fuel pump
 Dry sump lubrication system
 Compression ratio of 9.8:1
 Maximum power output:  at 6,000 rpm
 Maximum torque:  at 4,100 rpm
 Specific power output: 68.4 PS/L

Transmission:
 Type: 5-speed manual
 Clutch type: Single plate dry clutch
 Differential type: 80% limited slip differential

General:
 Drivetrain: Rear-wheel-drive
 Fuel tank capacity: 80-litres
 Battery: 12 volt lead acid battery
 Dry weight: 
 Weight (with fluids): 
 Weight distribution (front : rear): 39.6 : 60.4

Later Models

SCR 4.2 (2016) 

Introduced in 2016, the SCR 4.2 utilises the Porsche 993's body-in-white and its multi-link suspension but has extensive use of carbon-fibre in its body work and an integrated roll-cage; the car looks Porsche 964. The dashboard comes from the Porsche 993, and it has racing bucket seats with 6-point harness and carbon-fibre, Alcantara and tartan trim. Like the original SCR, the SCR 4.2 features a whale tail rear wing and a front bumper with round brake cooling ducts. The car weighs .

SCR (2018)  

At the 2018 Geneva Motor Show, exactly 40 years after the original SCR was introduced, Ruf introduced a new version of the SCR. The new SCR is based on the same principles as the CTR, introduced one year earlier, which includes parts built for the car from scratch. The car has a 6-speed manual transmission directing power to the rear wheels and an in-house developed push-rod suspension system. The car also has a carbon ceramic braking system for enhanced stopping power, with six-piston calipers at the front and four-piston calipers at the rear. Unlike the original SCR, the new SCR lacks the whale tail wing and features body work akin to the Porsche 964. The car was unveiled in the same shade of green as the original SCR.

References

External links 

SCR
Cars introduced in 1978
Cars powered by boxer engines
Rear-engined vehicles
Rear-wheel-drive vehicles
1980s cars